General Edmonds may refer to:

Albert J. Edmonds (born 1942), U.S. Air Force lieutenant general
James Edward Edmonds (1861–1956), British Army brigadier general
Maurice O. Edmonds (born 1931), U.S. Army major general